Muhammad 'Ali al-Sabuni (1 January, 1930 – 19 March, 2021) was a prominent Syrian Hanafi scholar. He is probably best known for his Qur'anic exegesis entitled Safwat al-Tafasir (The Elite of Interpretations). He has died at age of 91 in Turkey’s Yalova province.

Works 
He wrote dozens of books such as:

 His most well-known book is "Safwat Al-Tafasir "(In Arabic: صفوة التفاسير) which comes in 3 Volume Set .
 Muktasar tafsir Ibn Kathir, (in Arabic: مختصر تفسير ابن كثير).
 From Treasures Of The Sunnah (In Arabic: من كنوز السنة).

See also 

 Wahbah al-Zuhayli
 Muhammad Sa'id Ramadan al-Buti
 List of Hanafis
 List of Ash'aris and Maturidis

References

1930 births
2021 deaths
People from Aleppo
Muslim missionaries
Maturidis
Quranic exegesis scholars
Syrian Sunni Muslim scholars of Islam
Al-Azhar University alumni
Hadith scholars
Hanafi fiqh scholars
Syrian expatriates in Egypt